Karyn is an English-language given name and may refer to:

People with the name
Karyn Bailey (born 1986), Australian netball player
Karyn Bosnak (born 1974), American author
Karyn Bryant (born 1968), American actress, writer and television personality
Karyn Bye-Dietz (born 1971), American ice hockey player
Karyn Calabrese (born 1947), American raw foodist and restaurateur
Karyn Dwyer (1975–2018), Canadian actress
Karyn Faure (born 1969), French swimmer
Karyn Forbes (born 1991), Tobagonian soccer player
Karyn Garossino (born 1965), Canadian ice dancer
Karyn Gojnich (born 1960), Australian sailor
Karyn Hay (born 1959), New Zealand author and broadcaster
Karyn Khoury, American perfumer
Karyn Kupcinet (1941–1963), American actress
Karyn Kusama (born 1968), American film and television director
Karyn Marshall (born 1956), American weightlifter
Karyn McCluskey, Scottish forensic psychologist
Karyn Moffat, Canadian computer scientist
Karyn Monk (born 1960), Canadian writer
Karyn Olivier (born 1968), American artist and sculptor
Karyn Palgut (born 1962), American handballer
Karyn Paluzzano (born 1960), Australian politician
Karyn Parsons (born 1966), American actress, author and comedian
Karyn Polito (born 1966), American attorney and politician
Karyn Pugliese, Canadian broadcast journalist and communications specialist
Karyn Rachtman, American music supervisor
Karyn Rochelle, American country singer and songwriter
Karyn Spencer, American talent agent
Karyn Temple, American attorney
Karyn Turner (born 1946), American martial arts expert
Karyn Usher, American television producer and writer
Karyn Velez (1990–2013), Filipino–American badminton player
Karyn Walsh, Australian social justice advocate
Karyn White (born 1965), American singer
Karyn Williams (born 1979), American Christian musician

See also
Save Karyn, the name of both a Web site and a book
Murder of Karyn Hearn Slover, September 27, 1996 in Decatur, Illinois
Karen (disambiguation)
Karlyn
Kary (disambiguation)
Karyun
Kathryn

English-language feminine given names
English feminine given names